Cacostola mexicana is a species of beetle in the family Cerambycidae. It was described by Stephan von Breuning in 1943. It is known from Mexico.

References

Cacostola
Beetles described in 1943